Mark Thane is an American politician serving as a member of the Montana House of Representatives from the 99th district. Elected in November 2020, he assumed office on January 4, 2021.

Early life and education 
Thane was born and raised in Missoula, Montana. He earned a Bachelor of Arts degree and Master of Education from the University of Montana.

Career 
Prior to entering politics, Thane worked as a teacher and administrator in the Missoula County Public Schools for 39 years. From 2013 to 2015, he served as director of human resources and labor relations for the school district and later served as superintendent until his retirement in 2018.

References 

Living people
People from Missoula, Montana
University of Montana alumni
Democratic Party members of the Montana House of Representatives
Year of birth missing (living people)